Enijärvi is a lake of Finland. It is located near the town of Kemijärvi in the Lapland region in northern Finland. The lake is part of Kemijoki basin.

See also
List of lakes in Finland

References
 Finnish Environment Institute: Lakes in Finland

Kemijoki basin
Lakes of Kemijärvi